The list of shipwrecks in 2021 includes ships sunk, foundered, grounded, or otherwise lost during 2021.

January

2 January

12 January

13 January

17 January

18 January

19 January

21 January

23 January

24 January

27 January

29 January

30 January

February

13 February

14 February

17 February

20 February

24 February

26 February

March

3 March

7 March

11 March

14 March

18 March

20 March

23 March

24 March

25 March

27 March

30 March

April

1 April

3 April

4 April

5 April

6 April

10 April

12 April

13 April

14 April

18 April

19 April

21 April

26 April

May

2 May

3 May

4 May

7 May

15 May

17 May

19 May

22 May

25 May

26 May

27 May

28 May

29 May

June

1 June

2 June

5 June

12 June

13 June

17 June

20 June

29 June

July

1 July

8 July

18 July

21 July

22 July

31 July

August

1 August

5 August

6 August

12 August

14 August

15 August

19 August

26 August

28 August

29 August

September

8 September

14 September

22 September

24 September

29 September

October

3 October

16 October

18 October

23 October

25 October

29 October

November

2 November

3 November

8 November

9 November

12 November

15 November

17 November

23 November

24 November

28 November

29 November

30 November

December

1 December

6 December

10 December

11 December

12 December

13 December

14 December

16 December

17 December

20 December

22 December

23 December

24 December

25 December

Unknown date

Unknown date

References

Shipwrecks
2021